Marianne Buttenschon is an American politician and educator from the state of New York. She is a member of the New York State Assembly, representing the 119th district.

Early life and education 
Buttenschon was born and raised in Oneida County, and grew up in Whitesboro, New York. Her father, Bill Goodman, was town supervisor of Whitestown, New York and a member of the Oneida County legislature.

Buttenschon earned her Associate degree from Mohawk Valley Community College, followed by a B.A. in Public Justice from SUNY Polytechnic Institute. Buttenschon then earned a master's degree in Public Policy from Binghamton University and a Doctor of Education from Northeastern University.

Career 
Before entering politics, Buttenschon was the dean for emergency preparedness and public service at Mohawk Valley Community College, and had previously served as dean of students.

Buttenschon served as vice president of the Utica Community Food Bank and a member of the League of Women Voters. For 30 years, Buttenschon and her husband have operated the Buttenschon Christmas Tree Farm in Marcy, New York.

She announced her intention to run in the 2018 election for New York State Assembly to succeed Anthony Brindisi, who was elected to Congress. She defeated Republican Dennis Bova in the general election with 56% of the vote. In the 2020 election she defeated Republican candidate John Zielenski with 57% of the vote.

References

External links

Living people
People from Oneida County, New York
SUNY Polytechnic Institute alumni
Binghamton University alumni
Northeastern University alumni
21st-century American politicians
21st-century American women politicians
Democratic Party members of the New York State Assembly
Women state legislators in New York (state)
Year of birth missing (living people)